Diospyros ferrea, known as black ebony, is a tree in the ebony family, distributed in  Burma (Myanmar), Cambodia, India, Indonesia, Malay Peninsula, Philippines, Sri Lanka, Thailand, Laos (Khammouan) and Taiwan (Hengchun Peninsula and Orchid Island).

Common names
 Chinese - 象牙树 (literally "Ivory Tree")
 Philippines - batulinau 
 Indonesia - bibisan, ai meten, wawama 
 Sri Lanka - Hik-ul-Haenda
 Viet Nam - trandung
 French -  ngavi du fourré littoral (‘ngavi’ of littoral thickets, Aubréville).
 West African -  GHANA ADANGME gblεt∫o (FRI) NIGERIA HAUSA kas kawami (KO&S) YORUBA paroko (KO&S) SENEGAL DIOLA (Bayot) é tikuñi (JB) MANDING-MANINKA ko gélin ko: tree (JB) WOLOF sélah (JB)

Distribution
From West Africa to India, Indo-China, north to the Ryukyu Islands (Southern Japan), east to the Malesian area, Australia, Melanesia and Polynesia.

Uses
D. ferrea is reported to be an important source of black ebony, but this is doubtful because of the unsatisfactory taxonomy of the group involved.

Gallery

References

External resources
 
https://archive.today/20130707154040/http://211.114.21.20/tropicalplant/html/print.jsp?rno=950
http://plants.jstor.org/upwta/2_11
http://www.biotik.org/laos/species/d/diofe/diofe_en.html
https://web.archive.org/web/20160304053115/http://manoa.hawaii.edu/botany/plants_of_micronesia/index.php/scientific-names/360-diospyros-ferrea
https://tai2.ntu.edu.tw/species/508%20001%2004%200
https://kmweb.coa.gov.tw/theme_data.php?theme=plant_illustration&id=555

ferrea
Flora of tropical Asia
Flora of Japan